Michael Meros (September 29, 1950 – December 26, 2007) was an American keyboardist best known as a member of the Beach Boys touring band from 1979 until July 4, 2001.

Meros hailed from the Brooklyn Park neighborhood of Baltimore, Maryland. His entire family was musical and comprised a band known as the "Meros Brothers". Mike played in other bands as well, including Shelley's Emeralds, the Bare Essentials, The Ravens and the New Apocalypse.

Meros earned a degree in Music from the University of Maryland in 1972.

Death
Meros died unexpectedly of a heart attack on December 26, 2007.  He had been performing as recently as July 2007 with Al Jardine.

Obituary

References

External links
Zeises, Lara M. interview article, The Baltimore Sun, June 17, 1997, retrieved October 5, 2015

American keyboardists
The Beach Boys backing band members
1950 births
2007 deaths
Musicians from Baltimore
20th-century American musicians
University of Maryland, College Park alumni